A Bill of Divorcement is a 1922 British silent drama film based on Clemence Dane's play A Bill of Divorcement. The film was directed by Denison Clift and stars Constance Binney, Fay Compton and Malcolm Keen.

Synopsis

Cast
 Constance Binney as Sidney Fairfield
 Fay Compton as Margaret Fairfield
 Malcolm Keen as Hilary Fairfield (played same role in the play)
 Henry Victor as Grey Meredith
 Henry Vibart as Dr. Aliot
 Martin Walker as Kit Pumphery
 Fewlass Llewellyn as Reverend Christopher Pumphrey (played same role in the play)
 Dora Gregory as Hester Fairfield
 Sylvia Young as Bassett

References

External links

1922 films
British drama films
British silent feature films
Films directed by Denison Clift
1922 drama films
British films based on plays
Ideal Film Company films
Films set in England
British black-and-white films
Films about divorce
1920s English-language films
1920s British films
Silent drama films